This is a list of mountains and hills of Kitsap County, Washington by elevation.

The county's highest peaks are in the Blue Hills, in the Wildcat Lake or Bremerton West USGS quadrangle. Inclusion is defined here as within 2 miles of Green Mountain or Gold Mountain, as the boundaries are not strictly defined by authorities.

The Bainbridge Island high point's location is reported variously.  Lists of John gives Gazzam Lake Hill based on USGS topographic maps, which used stereoscopic aerial surveys. Peakbagger gives Toe Jam Hill at 15 feet higher or more, based on newer high-resolution LIDAR maps.

References

Sources

Kitsap County